Farm to Market Roads in Texas are owned and maintained by the Texas Department of Transportation (TxDOT).

FM 800

Farm to Market Road 800 (FM 800) is located in Cameron County in the Lower Rio Grande Valley.

FM 800 begins at an intersection with FM 2520 southwest of San Benito. The highway travels in a northwest direction and has an intersection with FM 509 and FM 1479 in Rangerville. FM 800 runs in a westward direction before turning to the north at FM 3067 near La Feria. The highway runs in a predominately northward direction along Bass Boulevard and briefly enters Harlingen where FM 800 meets I-2/US 83. FM 800 continues to run north before ending at intersection with SH 107 between Santa Rosa and Combes.

FM 800 was designated on July 20, 1948, running from US 83 near La Feria to SH 107. Later that year on November 23, the highway was extended south and eastward to FM 509. On July 15, 1949, FM 800 was extended eastward to Sam Houston Boulevard, which later became FM 2520 on October 31, 1957.

Junction list

FM 801

Farm to Market Road 801 (FM 801) is located in Cameron County.

FM 801 begins at an intersection with FM 800 in the southernmost part of Harlingen. The highway travels in a northeast direction along Ed Carey Drive before ending at I-69E/US 77/US 83. Ed Carey Drive continues north past here as Loop 499.

FM 801 was designated on July 20, 1948, running from US 77 to a point  to the southwest. On June 8, 1949, the highway was extended farther southwest to FM 800. On August 1, 1963, FM 801 was extended another mile along Ed Carey Drive into Harlingen; this section was later cancelled on May 21, 1979, when Loop 499 was created.

FM 802

Farm to Market Road 802 (FM 802) is located in Brownsville.

FM 802 begins at an intersection with  US 281. The route travels eastward along Ruben M. Torres Sr. Boulevard, and lies to the north of the Los Fresnos Canal. It crosses I-69E / US 77 / US 83,  FM 1847, and  SH 48 before ending at an intersection with  FM 511 north of Brownsville Airport.

FM 802 was initially designated on July 20, 1948, consisting of a segment from US 83 eastward to SH 48. On November 23, 1948, a westward extension to US 281 was added, and the eastern extension to FM 511 occurred on November 20, 1951. Originally, FM 802 followed Coffee Port Road through Brownsville, but the route was relocated to a more northerly alignment on May 20, 1975.

On June 27, 1995, the entire route was redesignated Urban Road 802 (UR 802). The designation reverted to FM 802 with the elimination of the Urban Road system on November 15, 2018.

FM 803

Farm to Market Road 803 (FM 803) is located in Cameron County.

FM 803 begins at I-169/SH 550/FM 511 in northern Brownsville near Olmito. The highway travels along Olmitto North Road through the city's northern part. FM 803 intersects SH 100 before leaving Brownsville. The highway intersects FM 2893 and FM 510 between Green Valley Farms and Laureles. FM 803 runs through Arroyo Gardens-La Tina Ranch where it intersects FM 1561 before ending at FM 106.

FM 803 was designated on July 20, 1948, running from Olmito to SH 100. The highway was extended farther north and west to FM 106 on November 23, 1948. The section of FM 803 between US 83 and FM 511 was removed from the state highway system on February 26, 1957. On November 10, 1967, the portion from FM 2358 (this section became part of FM 106 and the rest became part of FM 1847) west to FM 106 (this section was renumbered FM 2925) was transferred to rerouted FM 106. A new routing of FM 803 to I-69E/US 77 was constructed and was designated on December 13, 2018.

Junction list

FM 804

FM 805

FM 806

FM 807

Farm to Market Road 807 (FM 807) is located in Dallam and Hartley counties.

FM 807 begins at an intersection with US 87/US 385/FM 998 in Hartley. The highway travels in a northern direction before turning to the east at County Road I before turning back to the north at FM 3422. FM 807 has an overlap with FM 281 before entering into Dallam County. After entering Dallam County, FM 807 has an overlap with FM 297. The highway continues to travel north and has a brief overlap with US 54 through the town of Conlen. FM 807 travels through the Rita Blanca National Grassland before ending at an intersection with US 287 in Kerrick near the Oklahoma state line.

FM 807 was designated on July 20, 1948, running from US 54 in Conlen northward  to the Rita Blanca National Grassland. On July 14, 1949, the highway was extended southward  from Conlen to a road intersection. On May 23, 1951, FM 807 was extended farther south to FM 297. The highway was extended farther north  through the Rita Blanca National Grassland on November 21, 1956. FM 807 was extended farther north  on October 31, 1957, before being extended again to US 287 on February 27, 1958. On December 18, 1959, the highway was extended farther south into Hartley County to US 87/US 385 in Hartley, replacing part of FM 297 (a section became a  spur connection) and all of FM 1712 and FM 2029 in the process. The spur connection was transferred back to FM 297 on May 6, 1964.

Junction list

FM 808

Farm to Market Road 808 (FM 808) was located in Dallam County. No highway currently uses the FM 808 designation.

On December 16, 1948, the highway was extended  to the Texas/New Mexico state line. On April 30, 1955, FM 808 was signed (but not designated) as SH 102. FM 808 was cancelled on August 29, 1990, as the SH 102 designation became official.

FM 809

FM 810

Farm to Market Road 810 (FM 810) is located in Clay County. Its southern terminus is at SH 79 and SH 148 in central Petrolia.

FM 810 was previously part of SH 148. SH 148 previously continued from Petrolia northward to the Oklahoma state line, but was truncated to Charlie on August 1, 1941. The portion of SH 148 between Petrolia and Charlie was then transferred to FM 810 on August 24, 1948.

FM 811

FM 812

FM 813

Farm to Market Road 813 (FM 813) is located in Ellis County.

FM 813 begins at an intersection with FM 878 in Waxahachie and runs in a slight northeast direction along Brown Street. FM 813 crosses US 287 near Waxahachie High School and runs close to several subdivisions before leaving the town. The highway runs in a northeast direction and intersects with FM 387. At an intersection with FM 983 southwest of Ferris, FM 813 turns to the southeast and runs through the town of Palmer where it meets I-45. The highway ends at an intersection with FM 660 southwest of Bristol.

FM 813 was designated on July 20, 1948, running from Rockett to Grove Creek at a distance of approximately 10 miles. Later that year on November 23, the highway was extended southwestward to US 77 in Waxahachie. On July 15, 1949, FM 813 was extended to FM 660 southwest of Bristol. The last change came on January 27, 1950, when the section between US 77 and FM 878 in Waxahachie became a part of FM 878.

Junction list

FM 814

Farm to Market Road 814 (FM 814) is located in Fannin and Grayson counties.

FM 814 begins at an intersection with SH 160 north of Desert. The highway travels in an eastern direction and briefly turns to the north between Grayson County Road 4460 and County Line Road. FM 814 has a brief concurrency with SH 121 in eastern Trenton before ending at an intersection with Bus. US 69/FM 815 near the town's square.

FM 814 was designated on August 26, 1948, along its current route.

Junction list

FM 815

FM 816

FM 817

Farm to Market Road 817 (FM 817) is located in Bell County. It runs from FM 93 northeast to I-35/US 190.

FM 817 was designated on February 25, 1954, from SH 317 in Belton, northeast over old US 81 to US 81 (now I-35) southwest of Temple. On January 31, 1974, the section from SH 317 east  was transferred to FM 93. On October 27, 1977, a  section along Midway Drive was added, and the old route became FM Spur 817. On June 27, 1995, the entire route was redesignated Urban Road 817 (UR 817). On June 26, 2014, the spur connection was removed from the state highway system and returned to the city of Temple. The designation of the extant portion of the route reverted to FM 817 with the elimination of the Urban Road system on November 15, 2018.

FM 817 (1948)

The original FM 817 was designated in Howard County on June 1, 1948, from SH 350 north of Big Spring, northward  via Richland, to a county road intersection. On September 29, 1948, the southern terminus of FM 817 was relocated, shortening the route's length. On November 30, 1949, the road was extended north  to the Borden line. FM 817 was cancelled on October 30, 1953, and transferred to FM 669.

FM 818

FM 819

FM 819 (1948–1950)

The first use of the FM 819 designation was in Howard County, from US 87, 13 miles north of Big Spring, west to the Martin County line. FM 819 was cancelled on June 29, 1950, and became a portion of FM 846.

FM 819 (1958–1965)

The next use of the FM 819 designation was in Hunt County, from FM 513 north of Campbell southwest to FM 499 southwest of Campbell. FM 819 was cancelled on May 1, 1965, and transferred to the newly-created SH 50.

FM 820

FM 821

FM 822

FM 823

Farm to Market Road 823 (FM 823) was located in Jefferson County. It was designated on January 27, 1948, from SH 73 to Port Acres. The designation was extended southeastward  on December 17, 1952. On May 27, 1992, FM 823 was extended north to FM 365. On August 26, 1993, the section north of SH 73 was transferred to the new Spur 93. On June 27, 1995, the entire route was redesignated Urban Road 823 (UR 823). The route was cancelled on March 26, 2009, and the roadway was obliterated.

A second route designated FM 823 was erroneously designated on October 27, 2005, in Brown County. As the route in Jefferson County existed at the time, this route was transferred to FM 2376 on March 30, 2006.

FM 824

FM 825

FM 826

FM 827

FM 828

FM 829

FM 830

FM 830 (1948)

The original FM 830 was designated on September 29, 1948, from US 90, 2.5 miles east of Del Rio, north to Val Verde County Airport. FM 830 was cancelled on September 23, 1959, and removed from the highway system when the airport ceased operations.

FM 831

FM 832

FM 833

FM 834

FM 835

Farm to Market Road 835 (FM 835) is located in the Lubbock metropolitan area.

FM 835 begins at an intersection with Avenue A in eastern Lubbock. The highway travels eastward along 34th Street until an interchange with Martin Luther King Jr. Boulevard, where FM 835 turns southeast with 34th Street becoming Southeast Drive. FM 835 turns east at 50th Street, where it intersects with Spur 331. FM 835 runs east along 50th Street and crosses Loop 289 before leaving the city limits of Lubbock. The highway turns south at an intersection with FM 1729/FM 3523 near Ransom Canyon and Buffalo Springs Lake. FM 835 runs south and passes just west of Buffalo Springs Lake, where the highway briefly runs through a canyon. FM 835 continues to run south before ending at an intersection with US 84 northwest of Slaton.

FM 835 was first designated on September 29, 1948, running from US 84 near Slaton to US 84 near Lubbock, now Spur 331. On October 30, 1957, the highway was extended further northwest to Avenue A, which was then the current route of US 87 in Lubbock. On June 27, 1995, the section of FM 835 from Avenue A in Lubbock to Loop 289 was redesignated Urban Road 835 (UR 835). On February 25, 2010, the section from Spur 331 via Southeast Drive and 34th Street to Business US 87 was cancelled, and FM 835 was instead extended via 50th Street to I-27. The designation of the route reverted to FM 835 with the elimination of the Urban Road system on November 15, 2018.

Junction list

FM 836

FM 837

FM 837 (1948)

The original FM 837 was designated on October 29, 1948, from SH 155 north of Palestine to Brushy Creek. FM 837 was cancelled on July 14, 1949, and became a portion of FM 315.

FM 838

FM 839

FM 840

FM 841

FM 842

FM 843

FM 844

FM 845

FM 845 (1948–1949)

The first use of the FM 845 designation was in Culberson County, from SH 54 at Van Horn east to Culberson County Airport. FM 845 was cancelled on September 28, 1949, as the county refused to enter an agreement covering construction.

FM 845 (1951–1952)

The second use of the FM 845 designation was in Sherman County, from FM 289 (now SH 15), 14 miles east of Stratford, south  to a road intersection. FM 845 was cancelled on September 17, 1952, and transferred to FM 119.

FM 845 (1953–1954)

The third use of the FM 845 designation was in Smith County, from SH 31 west of Tyler north and east to FM 1803 northeast of Tyler. On October 26, 1954, the road was extended 8 miles south, east and north to SH 64/FM 1803 east of Tyler, forming a partial loop. FM 845 was cancelled two months later and became a portion of FM 1803 (now Loop 323).

FM 846

FM 847

FM 847 (1948)

The first use of the FM 847 designation was in Pecos County, from US 290 at Bakersfield north to US 67 near Girvin. FM 847 was cancelled on May 23, 1951, and became a portion of FM 11.

FM 847 (1951)

The second use of the FM 847 designation was in Terry County, from US 380 at Gomez north and west to a road intersection. On December 17, 1952, the road was extended  to US 62. FM 847 was cancelled on February 24, 1953, and transferred to FM 300.

FM 848

FM 849

FM 850

FM 851

FM 852

RM 853

 RM 853 was designated on October 29, 1948, as FM 853. FM 853 was changed to RM 853 on November 13, 1959.

FM 854

FM 854 (1948)

The original FM 854 was designated on October 29, 1948, from SH 110 in Rusk to FM 22 in Gallatin. FM 854 was cancelled on April 21, 1958, and transferred to FM 768.

FM 855

Farm to Market Road 855 (FM 855) is located in Cherokee County. It runs from US 175 in Cuney to US 69 in Mount Selman.

FM 855 was designated on October 29, 1948, from US 69 at Mount Selman westward . On November 20, 1951, it was extended to its current western terminus at US 175 in Cuney.

Junction list

FM 856

FM 857

FM 858

FM 859

FM 860

FM 861

FM 862

FM 862 (1948–1949)

The first use of the FM 862 designation was in Irion County, from US 67, 3.5 miles north of Mertzon, northward . FM 862 was cancelled nine months later and became a portion of FM 853 (now RM 853).

FM 862 (1951–1962)

The second use of the FM 862 designation was in Red River County, from SH 37 near Albion west to Blakeney. On August 24, 1955, the road was extended northwest . On November 9, 1960, a  section from near Blakeney Community east to SH 37 was transferred to FM 195. The remainder of FM 862 was cancelled on May 24, 1962, and transferred to FM 410.

FM 863
Farm to Market Road 863 (FM 863) is a designation that has been used twice. No highway currently uses the FM 863 designation.

FM 863 (1948–1953)

The first use of the FM 863 designation was in Mason County, from US 87 near Beaver Creek south to Hilda. FM 863 was cancelled on October 28, 1953, and transferred to FM 648 (now RM 783).

FM 863 (1953–1990)

The second and final use of the FM 863 designation was in Webb, LaSalle and Duval counties, from the Webb/LaSalle County line east via Encinal and southeast to SH 202 (now US 59) west of Freer as a replacement of a section of FM 133. On September 21, 1955, a  section from US 83 east to the Webb/LaSalle County line was added. On January 22, 1958, FM 863 was signed, but not designated, as part of SH 44. FM 863 was cancelled on August 29, 1990, as the designation of FM 863 as part of SH 44 became official.

RM 864

 RM 864 was designated on October 29, 1948, as FM 864. FM 864 was changed to RM 864 on November 13, 1959.

FM 865

Farm to Market Road 865 (FM 865) is located in Harris and Brazoria counties.

FM 865 begins at FM 518 in Pearland. It continues into Harris County, straddling the Houston city limits as it intersects the Sam Houston Tollway (Beltway 8). The route then runs through southern Houston before intersecting I-610. FM 865 then crosses railroad tracks before ending at US 90 Alternate. Cullen Boulevard continues as a city street from here to Brays Bayou.

The current FM 865 was established on September 13, 1984, along its current route. Its mileage was transferred from FM 518 as part of a realignment of the latter onto the routing of the canceled FM 3344. On June 27, 1995, the entire route was redesignated Urban Road 865 (UR 865). The designation reverted to FM 865 with the elimination of the Urban Road system on November 15, 2018.

FM 865 (1948–1951)

FM 865 was cancelled on July 14, 1949, and became a portion of RM 33 (now US 190).

FM 865/RM 865 (1951–1984)

On November 20, 1951, the designation was extended  to RM 33 (now US 190). On December 15, 1959, the designation was changed to Ranch to Market Road 865 (RM 865). In 1969, the route was signed, but not designated, as SH 137. RM 865 was cancelled on May 16, 1984, as the SH 137 designation became official.

FM 866

FM 867

FM 868

FM 869

Farm to Market Road 869 (FM 869) is located in Reeves County. It intersects FM 1934, then runs to the northwest before reaching its northern terminus at I-20 exit 33.

FM 869 was designated on October 29, 1948, along the current route. Until 1991, the road's northern terminus was at US 80, the progenitor route of I-20 in western Texas.

FM 870

Farm to Market Road 870 (FM 870) was located in Crane and Upton counties.

FM 870 was designated on October 29, 1948, from US 67 in Rankin northwest  to a road intersection. On May 23, 1951, the road was extended northwest . The road was extended another  to the Crane County line on December 18, 1951. The same day the road was extended  to SH 51 (now US 385). On May 21, 1953, FM 870 was signed (but not designated) as SH 329. FM 870 was cancelled on August 29, 1990, and officially designated as SH 329.

FM 871

FM 872

FM 872 (1948)

The original FM 872 was designated on October 29, 1948, from FM 871 to a point 1 mile northwest; although this was corrected four months later to go from FM 871 northwest  to FM 11. FM 872 was cancelled on April 28, 1950, in exchange for extending FM 871 and creating the current FM 872.

FM 873

FM 874

FM 875

FM 876

Farm to Market Road 876 (FM 876) is located in Ellis County.

FM 876 was designated on October 29, 1948, running from FM 66 in Waxahachie southwestward  to near Five Points. On June 30, 1958, the section of FM 876 from FM 66 to I-35E was cancelled. On July 11, 1968, FM 876 was extended southwest . On November 25, 1975, FM 876 was extended southwest  to its current terminus.

FM 877

FM 878

Farm to Market Road 878 (FM 878) is located in Ellis County.

FM 878 begins at an intersection with US 77 in Waxahachie. The highway runs in a slight southeast direction along Marvin Avenue and has an intersection with FM 813 just a few blocks east of US 77. FM 878 turns at a nearly 90 degree angle and Marvin Avenue becomes Hackberry Street. The highway turns onto Cleaver Road and meets FM 879 at its interchange with US 287. FM 878 exits the Waxahachie city limits and runs through rural areas of Ellis County before ending at an intersection with FM 813 in western Palmer. The highway acts as a more direct and shorter route between Waxahachie and Palmer over FM 813.

FM 878 was designated on October 29, 1948, along the current route.

Junction list

FM 879

FM 880

Farm to Market Road 880 (FM 880) is a two-lane highway that connects the farming areas of Cross Plains, Putnam and Moran with Interstate 20 (I‑20), SH 206, and SH 6. The highway continues from Cross Plains northward through eastern Callahan County and continues to Putnam and connects to SH 6 via a short spur route. The road continues into Shackelford County and ends in Moran.

FM 880 was originally designated from SH 36 north  to Cottonwood. On September 5, 1951, FM 880 was rerouted over FM 1079 from FM 880's current junction with FM 1079 to US 80 (now I‑20). The old route of FM 880 from FM 1079 west to Cottonwood was renumbered as FM 1079, swapping the alignments of the routes. On January 28, 1953, FM 880 was extended north to US 380 (now SH 6), replacing FM 1832 on that route. On July 15, 1957, FM 880 was extended north over part of Loop 318 to FM 576, and the rest of Loop 318 became a spur of FM 880. On March 22, 1960, the section of FM 880 from SH 36 north  was transferred to SH 206.

Junction list

FM 881

Farm to Market Road 881 (FM 881) is located in Marion County.

FM 881 was designated on December 21, 1994, on its current route from SH 49 north to the International Paper Plant west of Jefferson.

FM 881 (1948)

The original FM 881 was designated on November 23, 1948, from FM 136, 0.5 mile south of the Aransas County line, east to SH 35 (now Business SH 35-L) in Rockport. On October 26, 1954, the road was extended west  to US 181 east of Sinton. On March 24, 1958, the road was extended west  to SH 9 (now I-37) southeast of Mathis, replacing FM 894 and part of FM 630 and creating a concurrency with US 181. On May 7, 1970, the road was extended east  to Loop 70. On December 22, 1992, a  section of FM 881 from I-37 to FM 1069 was transferred to the newly-created SH 188, leaving only the section from SH 188 southwest of Rockport northeast to Business SH 35-L. On June 29, 1993, this section was cancelled and transferred to FM 1069 when it was rerouted.

FM 882

FM 883

FM 884

FM 885

FM 886

FM 886 (1948)

The original FM 886 was designated on January 23, 1948, from an intersection with SH 123 via Panna Maria to the west end of the Cibolo Creek bridge as a replacement of Spur 129. On July 14, 1949, the road was extended  to an intersection with SH 80 at Helena. FM 886 was cancelled on January 6, 1950, and became a portion of FM 81.

FM 887

FM 888

FM 889

FM 890

Farm to Market Road 890 (FM 890) is located in Wichita County, traveling mostly in Wichita Falls.

FM 890 begins at I-44/US 277/US 281 in northern Wichita Falls. The highway travels along Airport Drive in a mostly eastern direction and has a junction with Spur 325. FM 890 continues to run in an eastern direction through rural areas of the city and turns northeast at SH 240. The highway turns back east at McKinley Road, passes south of the Wichita Falls Municipal Airport, and exits the city before ending at an intersection with FM 171.

The highway was extended  eastward from Loop 165 to FM 171 on June 20, 1961. FM 890 was extended  westward from Spur 325 to US 277/US 281 (now part of I-44) on May 6, 1964. The entire highway was internally re-designated as Urban Road 890 (UR 890) by TxDOT on June 27, 1995. The designation reverted to FM 890 with the elimination of the Urban Road system on November 15, 2018.

Junction list

FM 890 (1948)

The highway was cancelled and removed from the state highway system in 1949.

FM 890 (1951)

The highway was extended south to US 83 on December 14, 1956. The highway was cancelled on January 8, 1957, with the mileage being transferred to FM 493.

FM 891

Farm to Market Road 891 (FM 891) was located in Nueces County.

FM 891 was designated on November 23, 1948, from SH 286/SH 358 south of Corpus Christi to SH 9 (now I-37), 1.5 miles west of Corpus Christi. FM 891 was cancelled on April 24, 1958, and transferred to SH 358.

FM 892

FM 893

FM 894

Farm to Market Road 894 (FM 894) was located in San Patricio County.

FM 894 was designated on November 23, 1948, from FM 630, 5.5 miles west of Sinton, west to SH 9 (now I-37) southeast of Mathis. FM 894 was cancelled on March 24, 1958, and transferred to FM 881 (now SH 188).

FM 895

FM 896

FM 897

FM 898

FM 899

Notes

References

+08
Farm to market roads 0800
Farm to Market Roads 0800